Mapping may refer to:

 Mapping (cartography), the process of making a map
 Mapping (mathematics), a synonym for a mathematical function and its generalizations
 Mapping (logic), a synonym for functional predicate

Types of mapping
 Animated mapping, the depiction of events over time on a map using sequential images representing each timeframe
 Brain mapping, the techniques used to study the brain
 Data mapping, data element mappings between two distinct data models
 Digital mapping, the use of a computer to depict spatial data on a map
 Gene mapping, the assignment of DNA fragments to chromosomes
 Mind mapping, the drawing of ideas and the relations among them
 Projection mapping, the projection of videos on the surface of objects with irregular shapes
 Robotic mapping, creation and use of maps by robots
 Satellite mapping, taking photos of Earth from space
 Spiritual mapping, a practice of some religions
 Texture mapping, in computer graphics
 Web mapping, the use of the World Wide Web to depict spatial data on a map

See also
 
 

 Mapping theorem (disambiguation)
 Mappings (poetry)
 Surveying, the field work of gathering map data